The Devil's Arithmetic is a 1999 TV movie based on the historical novel of the same name by Jane Yolen. It stars Kirsten Dunst as Hannah Stern and costars Brittany Murphy, Louise Fletcher, and Mimi Rogers. Dustin Hoffman introduces the film but is uncredited and serves as an executive producer with Mimi Rogers.

Plot
The film opens with Hannah, a teen girl, in a tattoo parlor with her friends, contemplating what tattoo she wants. Before she can decide, she notes the time and realizes she is late for a Passover dinner. Hannah hates going to her family seder as her family tells the same stories and Hannah is tired of hearing about the past. Her aunt tells her every year that Hannah looks like her namesake, Chana, but won't tell Hannah who Chana was or what she did. During the seder Hannah opens the front door to let in the prophet Elijah, but she sees a Polish village instead of the outside of the apartment. All of a sudden she is not only in a new place but also in the year 1941.

Hannah learns she is in the home of Rivka, who says she is Hannah (now Chana)'s cousin, and her aunt Gitl. They tell Hannah she has been sick and that should explain her strange ramblings about the future. The next day, the family goes into the village for a wedding, which is interrupted by Nazi soldiers, who say the whole village will be resettled. After a long journey, they arrive at a Nazi concentration camp. There, their valuables are stolen, their heads are shorn, they are tattooed, and they are made prisoners.

Life is brutal, but Hannah tells fairy tales and stories to the women in her bunk to keep their spirits up, and she insists that she knows what is coming because of her history classes in school, but no one believes her. Tensions rise when a family is revealed to have typhus and when a woman goes into labor, some of the men attempt an escape when they find a guard they think they can trust, only to be caught and executed.

One day, the commandant notices that Rivka and other inmates are ill, so he orders them to go to the gas chamber. Before he can see, Hannah switches places with Rivka. As she enters the gas chamber, she is transported back to the present day, awakening surrounded by her family, who tell her she had too much to drink (and presumably passed out). She embraces her aunt Eva and calls her Rivka, to her astonishment. They speak privately and Hannah fills in details she did not previously know. The movie ends with the entire family singing traditional songs at the table - the teenage Hannah is no longer alienated but is now part of the family.

Production
The film was shot in Vilnius, Lithuania in fall 1998 and a concentration camp set was built before shooting began and was designed to resemble Auschwitz.

Cast

 Kirsten Dunst as Hannah Stern/Chana Abramowicz
 Brittany Murphy as Rivka
 Paul Freeman as Rabbi
 Mimi Rogers as Leonore Stern
 Louise Fletcher as Aunt Eva
 Daniel Brocklebank as Shmuel
 Shelly Skandrani as Leah
 Philip Rham as Commandant Krieger
 Daniel Rausch as Sgt. Steinbach
 Kristy McFarland as Yetta
 Paulina Soloveičik as Sarah
 Lilo Baur as Mina
 Nitzan Sharron as Ariel
 Rachel Roddy as Esther
 Ivea Jackevičiūtė as Miriam
 Stewart Bick as Burton Stern
 Vaidotas Martinaitis as Hans
 Inga Tuminienė as Ingrid
 Nijolė Narmontaitė as Hedwig
 Leonardas Pobedonoscevas as Isaac
 Ava Finch as Aliza
 Louis Negin as Uncle Morris
 Caterina Scorsone as Jessica

Reception

References

External links
 

Holocaust films
American drama films
Showtime (TV network) films
1999 drama films
Films based on American novels
1999 television films
1999 films
Films shot in Lithuania
Films based on works by Jane Yolen
1990s English-language films
Films directed by Donna Deitch
1990s American films